Holmwood Estate is a tea estate in the Agrapatana region in Nuwara Eliya District, Central Province of Sri Lanka. The estate was established by Henry St. George Caulfield in 1878 and was named after Holmwood, a parish in Surrey, England. It comprises two Divisions: Holmwood and Sutton Divisions. Holmwood Division is the major division with a larger population. The Estate has about 392 workers.

Geography

Most of the remaining area utilized for settlements called 'line rooms', typical residences built by British during colonial periods. The Estate shares a breezing climate due to the adjoining Agra-Bopath forest reserve, which is an evergreen forest in Nuwara Eliya District, which is connected to Horton Plains National Park on the East.

History
Holmwood Estate was established and governed by the British, between 1824 - 1957. It has a history of almost 139 years since 1880. Many British managers have managed the estate as given in the table below;

Economy

The estate mainly produces tea along with other minor agricultural products, mostly highland vegetables, including leek, potato, carrot and beetroot.

The estate is managed by Agrapatana Plantations Limited, a Public Company with Limited Liability in Sri Lanka. During 2006-2007, the estate produced  of tea, with a yield of 1,160 kg per ha.

Demographics

The residents of the estate share the cultural traditions of Indian Tamils of Sri Lanka. A small number of inhabitants are Sinhalese. Inhabitants follow Hinduism, Christianity or Buddhism. Hinduism (Shaivism) (Tamil: சைவ சமயம்) is the main religion, followed by more than 70% of the residents.

Inhabitants are a mixture of Tamil and Sinhalese. Indian-origin Tamils are the major ethnic group.

Festivals

Although the Tamils follow Shaivism, they worship the Mariamman deity as well. Each family has its ancestral deities. However, Māri,Tulu(Mari), also known as Mariamman ( and Mariaai (Marathi: मरी आई), both meaning "Mother Mari", also spelt Maariamma, or simply Amman or 'n' Atha ("mother") is worshiped by many as part of common festivals. Residents of the Holmwood Estate practice few unique festival rituals.

Attractions

Ramar Mali 

Ramar Mali a mountain with a temple of Rama at the peak which is situated on the borders of Agra-Bopath Forest reserve. Agrapatana-Bopathalawa Forest Reserve got caught on fire during May 2016. This mountain is regarded as the most interesting place for the people in Agrapatana, Dayagama and Glenlyon. People, mostly Tamils, from all estates in the vicinity used to visit this mountain. The folklore about the temple is well-known to residents. People who were working on cleaning the peak for a tea plantation when they found an arrow-like steel rod that was believed to be an arrow used by Rama during his war with Ravana as described in Ramayana. Since the day that arrow was found, the place started to be worshiped by Hindus and visited by pilgrims.

Sutton Hill 

 The Sutton division is administratively part of Holmwood Estate. It is situated at the bottom of a mountain range known as Sutton Hill.

Estate School 

The Estate School is the second educational institute after the pre-school. Estate school covers up to Grade V. Its five teachers include the Principal. The school opened in the 1960s.

Climate

Holmwood Estate shares the climatic conditions prevailing in Nuwara Eliya. It is Hill Country Climate: From January to April the temperature ranges from 21-14 °C, May to 18–16 August °C and from September to 18–15 December °C. Seasons are milder than in Nuwara Eliya. The forest cover in the South is evidence for its climatic richness.

References

External links 
 

Indian Tamils of Sri Lanka
Populated places in Sri Lanka